The 1948 The Citadel Bulldogs football team represented The Citadel, The Military College of South Carolina in the 1948 college football season.  J. Quinn Decker served as head coach for the third season.  The Bulldogs played as members of the Southern Conference and played home games at the new Johnson Hagood Stadium.

Schedule

References

Citadel Bulldogs
The Citadel Bulldogs football seasons
Citadel football